Dániel Kasza (born 1 August 1994 in Eger) is a Hungarian football player who plays for Kelen SC.

Club statistics

External links
 Profile 
 MLSZ

1994 births
Living people
Hungarian footballers
Association football midfielders
Sportspeople from Eger
Egri FC players
Rákospalotai EAC footballers
Cigánd SE players
Nemzeti Bajnokság I players
Nemzeti Bajnokság II players